Pont-Farcy is a former commune in the Manche department in the Normandy region in northwestern France. Before 1 January 2018, it was part of the Calvados department. On 1 January 2018, it was merged into the commune of Tessy-Bocage.

History
Pont-Farcy has its origins in Gallo-Roman times: the town has always been an important crossing place due to its bridge over the River Vire. It was also passed through by the Dukes of Normandy. Before the 20th century, there is little evidence to suggest the village held much more than peasants; it probably wasn't considered a particularly important spot, as Saint-Sever-Calvados was. During the 20th century, the village became a thriving river port, and a tow path for barges starts here and reaches as far as the Baie de Seine and the Normandy landing beaches. The village originally had a railway bridge over the Vire, but this was blown up by the Nazis upon their retreat from the village in 1944. Pont-Farcy was liberated by the American 35th Infantry Division on 2 August 1944.

In the latter half of the 20th century the population has dropped from nearly 1,000 to about 500, although in recent years it has grown slightly. This has a lot to do with the Autoroute which passes just north of the village.

Population

Its inhabitants are known as Farcy-Pontains.

Geography
The village is located on the D307a road, and the nearest sizable villages are Villedieu-les-Poêles to the southwest, Saint-Martin-des-Besaces to the northeast, Tessy-sur-Vire and Saint-Lô to the north, and  Sainte-Marie-Outre-l'Eau, Beaumesnil and Vire to the south.

Pont-Farcy is a small rural village, surrounded by many small hamlets (some of which are no more than a single farm); sizable settlements neighbouring Pont-Farcy are named above. Pont-Farcy has a petrol station, a bar and newsagents, a hotel and restaurant called "Le Coq Hardi", a church with graveyard and a separate cemetery, the latter of which practices the French custom of naming the living on the tombstones (leaving the year of death blank). There is also a campsite along the banks of the River Vire, with an outdoor pursuits centre from which bikes and canoes can be hired.

Personalities
One of the village's most famous residents is the Russian-born artist Timur D'Vatz, who is currently exhibiting in London, Venice, New York City and Paris.

References

Former communes of Calvados (department)
Manche communes articles needing translation from French Wikipedia